Ikenna Hillary (born 17 April 1991) is a Nigerian professional footballer who played as defensive midfielder for Kano Pillars FC. He was also a member of the Nigeria national football team.

International career
In January 2014, coach Stephen Keshi, invited him to be included in the Nigeria 23-man team for the 2014 African Nations Championship. He helped Nigeria defeat Zimbabwe by a goal to nil for a third-place finish.

References

External links
 
 Ikenna Hilary at Footballdatabase

1991 births
Living people
Nigeria A' international footballers
2014 African Nations Championship players
Nigerian footballers
Place of birth missing (living people)
MFK Skalica players
Slovak Super Liga players
Valletta F.C. players
Maltese Premier League players
Expatriate footballers in Slovakia
Nigerian expatriate sportspeople in Slovakia
Expatriate footballers in Malta
Nigerian expatriate sportspeople in Malta
Expatriate footballers in Portugal
Nigerian expatriate sportspeople in Portugal
Expatriate footballers in Ethiopia
Nigerian expatriate sportspeople in Ethiopia
Association football defenders
Nigeria international footballers